Barom Reachea V (born Ang Sô; 1628–December 1672) was King of Cambodia from 1658 to 1672.

Ang So was the second son of regent Outey. In 1658, Ponhea Chan (Sultan Ibrahim) overthrew Outey and massacred his family. Ang So and his brother Ang Tan revolted against Chan. At first they were defeated and took refuge by Neak Ang Chov. The latter convinced them to seek help from Huế.

Reinforced by a Vietnamese army, they took the offensive in October 1658. They defeated and killed their own brother Ang Em, who had sided with Ponhea Chan, in a naval battle. The Vietnamese captured Chan, locked him in an iron cage and deported to Quảng Bình, where he soon died.

Ang So ascended the throne under the name of Barom Reachea VIII. For Huế's help, Cambodia granted permission to the Vietnamese to settle in Cambodia, to own lands and agreed to pay tribute to Huế.

In December 1672, he was killed and usurped by his nephew Chey Chettha III.

References

 Phoeun Mak, Dharma Po « La première intervention militaire vietnamienne au Cambodge (1658-1659) » dans: Bulletin de l'École française d'Extrême-Orient, tome 73, 1984, p. 285-318.
 Chroniques Royales du Cambodge de 1594 à 1677. École française d'Extrême Orient. Paris 1981 
 Achille Dauphin-Meunier  Histoire du Cambodge Presses universitaires de France, Paris 1968 Que sais-je ? n° 916.

1628 births
1672 deaths
17th-century Cambodian monarchs
Assassinated people
People murdered in Cambodia
17th-century murdered monarchs